Jonatan Braut Brunes (born 7 August 2000) is a Norwegian footballer who plays as a striker for Strømsgodset.

He started his career in Bryne FK, making his debut in the 2016 1. divisjon, becoming the youngest player to ever play for the club. He spent the spring of 2019 in Sola FK before joining fellow third-tiers Florø SK. After 10 goals in 13 games in the 2020 2. divisjon, he was loaned by Lillestrøm SK. Ahead of the 2021 season the move was made permanent. He made his Eliteserien debut in May 2021 against Viking, scoring Lillestrøm's only goal.

His younger sister, Emma Braut Brunes, plays as a defender for Klepp. His first cousins, Erling Haaland and Albert Tjåland, both play as strikers for Manchester City and Molde respectively.

Career statistics

References

2000 births
Living people
People from Time, Norway
Norwegian footballers
Bryne FK players
Sola FK players
Florø SK players
Lillestrøm SK players
IK Start players
Norwegian Fourth Division players
Norwegian Third Division players
Norwegian Second Division players
Norwegian First Division players
Eliteserien players
Association football forwards
Sportspeople from Rogaland